Yu Dong (born January 8, 1971), also known as Don Yu, is a Chinese businessman, film producer and presenter. He is also as the chairman of Bona Film Group, a production company and film distributor, which has distributed and co-produced over 100 Chinese-language films, such as Confession of Pain, Dragon Tiger Gate, and Flash Point.

Career
A graduate of the Beijing Film Academy, Yu went on to work at China's largest film complex, Beijing Film Studio. He was then in charge of domestic distribution at China Film Group Corporation for several years before he set up the Beijing Bona Culture Communication Co. in 1999.

He later established Polybona Films, which is one of the first private firms to be granted a distribution license by the China Film Bureau. Under Yu's leadership, PolyBona has become the most successful distribution company in China and earned itself the nickname "the Chinese Miramax."

Yu's policy has been to build up good will among cinema managers in China, using screenings to show that PolyBona was capable of getting people into the cinemas without the worries of movie piracy. His company is also involved in the distribution of films from Europe and throughout Asia.

Yu has also turned his attention to developing China's fledgling exhibitions, and he chairs the board of the PolyWanhe cinema chain group, which currently owns 70 screens. He has invested in building nine five-star multiplex cinemas in Chongqing in southwestern China and plans to build 15 more cinemas with more than 200 screens over the next five years. Yu has also established his own advertising firm and performance company.

PolyBona has developed a reputation for being good at marketing and attracting worthwhile product, and Yu believes that as the biz becomes more market-oriented and international, the company's professionalism, standardized management and vision will help it to keep growing.

References

Living people
Chinese film producers
Beijing Film Academy alumni
1971 births